Aude Banasiak (born 8 October 1975) is a French former professional women's football player.

She won the Division 2 Féminine twice; in 1999 with Saint-Memmie and 2001 with PSG.

References

External links
 
 

Women's association football fullbacks
Paris Saint-Germain Féminine players
Division 1 Féminine players
1975 births
Living people
French women's footballers